Simon Lee may refer to:

 Simon Lee (conductor), conductor and musical supervisor
 Simon Lee (academic) (born 1957), former Vice-Chancellor of Leeds Metropolitan University
 Simon Lee (businessman) (born 1961), British business executive

See also